The Beaumont–Port Arthur metropolitan statistical area is defined by the United States Census Bureau as a three-county region in Southeast Texas. The metropolitan area shares borders with the Houston–The Woodlands–Sugar Land metropolitan area to the west and the Lake Charles metropolitan area in the U.S. state of Louisiana to the east. The area is also known as the Golden Triangle. The "golden" refers to the wealth that came from the Spindletop oil strike near Beaumont in 1901, and "triangle" refers to the area among the cities of Beaumont, Port Arthur, and Orange.

According to the 2000 census, it had a population of 385,090 (though the 2010 census placed the population at 388,745). Newton County was added to the metropolitan area in the February, 2013 delineation (OMB Bulletin 13-01); the addition of Newton County increased the 2010 population by 14,445. At the 2020 census, the metropolitan area's population increased to 397,565, becoming the 139th most populous metropolitan statistical area in the U.S.

Counties
Hardin
Jefferson
Orange

Communities

Places with more than 100,000 inhabitants
Beaumont (principal city)

Places with more than 50,000 inhabitants
Port Arthur (principal city)

Places with 10,000 to 50,000 inhabitants

Orange (principal city)
Nederland
Groves
Port Neches
Vidor
Lumberton

Places with fewer than 10,000 inhabitants

Bevil Oaks
Bridge City
Central Gardens (census-designated place)
China
Kountze
Mauriceville (census-designated place)
Nome
Pine Forest
Pinehurst
Pinewood Estates (census-designated place)
Rose City
Rose Hill Acres
Silsbee
Sour Lake
Taylor Landing
West Orange

Unincorporated places

Batson
Fannett
Forest Heights
Hamshire
Honey Island
LaBelle
Little Cypress
Orangefield
Saratoga
Thicket
Village Mills
Votaw
Wildwood

Demographics
As of the census of 2020, there were 397,565 people, 150,085 households, 101,240 families, and 169,646 housing units within the MSA. The racial makeup of the MSA was 56.31% White (non-Hispanic White 52.3%), 23.86% African American, 2.09% Native American, 2.88% Asian, 0.03% Pacific Islander, 8.09% from other races, and 2.83% from two or more races. Hispanic or Latino of any race were 17.51% of the population.

The median income for a household in the MSA was $36,635, and the median income for a family was $43,111. Males had a median income of $37,595 versus $22,869 for females. The per capita income for the MSA was $17,696.

See also

List of Texas metropolitan areas
United States metropolitan area
List of United States metropolitan statistical areas by population

References

 
Metropolitan areas of Texas